New Zealand competed at the 2020 Summer Olympics in Tokyo. Originally scheduled to take place from 24 July to 9 August 2020, the 2020 Games were postponed to 23 July to 8 August 2021 because of the COVID-19 pandemic. It was the country's twenty-fourth appearance as an independent nation at the Summer Olympics, having made its debut at the 1920 Summer Olympics in Antwerp and competed at every Games since. The New Zealand team consisted of 212 athletes, 112 men and 100 women, across twenty-one sports.

The New Zealand team collected a total of 20 medals, seven gold, six silver and seven bronze, at these Games, surpassing the record of 18 gained at the 2016 Summer Olympics. The seven gold medals collected was second only to the eight medals collected at the 1984 Summer Olympics. Rowing led the sports with five medals, followed by canoeing with three medals, two medals in each of rugby sevens, cycling and athletics, and one medal in each of sailing, golf, boxing, trampolining, tennis and triathlon. It was the first time New Zealand won medals in trampolining (and gymnastics in general) and tennis.

Sprint canoeist Lisa Carrington won gold medals in the women's K-1 200 metres, K-1 500 metres and with Caitlin Regal in the K-2 500 metres to become New Zealand's most successful Olympian with six medals in all, including five gold medals. Rower Emma Twigg claimed the gold medal in the women's single sculls after finishing fourth in the previous two Games. The men's rowing eight claimed the gold medal for the first time since 1972, with Hamish Bond becoming the first New Zealander to win a gold medal at three successive Olympics. Rowing pair Kerri Gowler and Grace Prendergast won the gold medal in the women's pair before helping the women's eight win the silver medal. The women's rugby sevens team beat France 26–12 in the final to claim the gold medal, bettering their silver medal at the 2016 Games.

Medal tables

Unless otherwise stated, all dates and times are in Japan Standard Time (UTC+9), three hours behind New Zealand Standard Time (UTC+12).

| width="78%" align="left" valign="top" |

|style="text-align:left;width:22%;vertical-align:top;"|

Officials
Former rower Rob Waddell is the chef de mission for the 2020 Tokyo Olympics. He was appointed in December 2012 to lead the Olympic team to the 2016 Rio Olympics and has been confirmed for this role for Tokyo.

Competitors
The following is the list of number of competitors in the Games. Reserves in field hockey, football, and rowing are not counted.

Seventeen-year-old swimmer Erika Fairweather (born 31 December 2003) was New Zealand's youngest competitor, while 51-year-old equestrian showjumper Bruce Goodin (born 10 November 1969) was the oldest competitor. Thirty-three competitors (15.6 percent) were of Māori descent.

Athletics

New Zealand athletes further achieved the entry standards, either by qualifying time or by world ranking, in the following track and field events (up to a maximum of three athletes in each event):

Fifteen track and field athletes were officially named to the New Zealand team on 16 April 2021, with shot putter and triple Olympic medalist Valerie Adams leading them to her historic fifth Games. Notable athletes also featured multiple medallist Nick Willis in the middle-distance running and the reigning Commonwealth Games champion and Rio 2016 bronze medalist Tom Walsh in the men's shot put.

Track & road events

Field events

Boxing 

New Zealand entered one male boxer into the Olympic tournament for the first time since 2004. 2014 and 2018 Commonwealth Games champion David Nyika scored an outright quarterfinal victory to secure a spot in the men's heavyweight division at the 2020 Asia & Oceania Qualification Tournament in Amman, Jordan.

Canoeing

Slalom
New Zealand canoeists qualified one boat for each of the following classes through the 2019 ICF Canoe Slalom World Championships in La Seu d'Urgell, Spain. Former software engineer Callum Gilbert, with Rio 2016 silver medalist Luuka Jones paddling along her way to fourth straight Olympics, was officially named to the New Zealand's slalom canoeing roster on 12 March 2020.

Sprint
New Zealand canoeists qualified four boats in each of the following distances for the Games through the 2019 ICF Canoe Sprint World Championships in Szeged, Hungary and the 2020 Oceania Championships in Penrith, New South Wales. Max Brown and Kurtis Imrie were officially named to the New Zealand canoe sprint roster for the Games on 21 April 2021, with the women's kayak squad, led by two-time defending Lisa Carrington, joining them two months later.

Qualification Legend: FA = Qualify to final (medal); FB = Qualify to final B (non-medal)

Cycling

Road
New Zealand entered two riders to compete in the men's Olympic road race, by virtue of their top 50 national finish (for men) in the UCI World Ranking. The road cycling team was officially named to the New Zealand roster for the Games on 17 June 2021.

Track
Following the completion of the 2020 UCI Track Cycling World Championships, New Zealand riders accumulated spots for both men and women in the team pursuit and madison, as well as the men's team sprint, based on their country's results in the final UCI Olympic rankings. As a result of their place in the men's team sprint, New Zealand won its right to enter two riders in the men's sprint and keirin.

On 19 November 2020, the New Zealand Olympic Committee officially named a fifteen-member track cycling squad for the rescheduled Tokyo 2020, with Aaron Gate, Jaime Nielsen, Rushlee Buchanan, and Rio 2016 team sprint silver medallist Ethan Mitchell racing around the velodrome at their third straight Olympics.

Sprint

Team sprint

Pursuit

Qualification legend: Q: qualified, in contention for gold medal final; q: qualified, in contention for bronze medal final; FB: qualified for bronze medal final

Keirin

Omnium

Madison

Mountain biking
New Zealand qualified one mountain biker for the men's Olympic cross-country race, as a result of his nation's sixteenth-place finish in the UCI Olympic Ranking List of 16 May 2021. The New Zealand Olympic Committee nominated Anton Cooper to occupy the slot for the rescheduled Games on 17 June 2021.

BMX
New Zealand riders qualified for one women's quota place in BMX at the Olympics, as a result of the nation's ninth-place finish in the UCI BMX Olympic Qualification Ranking List of 1 June 2021. The New Zealand Olympic Committee nominated the BMX rider Rebecca Petch to occupy the slot for the rescheduled Games on 17 June 2021.

Diving

For the first time since Los Angeles 1984, New Zealand sent one male diver into the Olympic competition by finishing in the top eighteen of the men's springboard at the 2021 FINA Diving World Cup in Tokyo.

Equestrian

New Zealand fielded a squad of three equestrian riders each in the team eventing and jumping competitions through the 2018 FEI World Equestrian Games in Tryon, North Carolina, United States and the International Equestrian Federation (FEI)-designated Olympic jumping qualifier for Group G (South East Asia and Oceania) in Valkenswaard, Netherlands. MeanwhIle, one dressage rider was added to the New Zealand roster by finishing in the top two, outside the group selection, of the individual FEI Olympic Rankings for Group G (South East Asia and Oceania).

Shortly before the Olympics, New Zealand withdrew from competing in dressage. The nation's leading rider Melissa Galloway cited the disrupted preparations amidst the COVID-19 pandemic, EHV-1 outbreak and Brexit as the reason behind the withdrawal.

Eventing
The New Zealand eventing team was named on 29 June 2021. Bundy Philpott and Tresca have been named the travelling reserves.

Jumping
The New Zealand jumping team was named on 22 June 2021. The team consists of three Olympic veterans, while the California-based Uma O'Neill and Clockwise of Greenhill Z have been named the travelling reserves.

Sharn Wordley later withdrew following an injury to his horse. Subsequently, Uma O'Neill got promoted to the team, while Tom Tarver-Priebe and Popeye were assigned the reserve spot. The day before the team competition, a further change was made with Tarver-Priebe (Popeye) replacing O'Neill (Clockwise Of Greenhill Z).

Field hockey

Summary

Men's tournament

New Zealand men's national field hockey team qualified for the Olympics by securing one of the seven tickets available and defeating South Korea in a playoff at the Stratford leg of the 2019 FIH Olympic Qualifiers.

Team roster

Group play

Women's tournament

New Zealand women's field hockey team qualified for the Olympics by winning the gold medal on a goal difference over Australia at the 2019 Oceania Cup in Rockhampton, Queensland.

Team roster

Group play

Quarterfinal

Football

Summary

Men's tournament

New Zealand men's football team qualified for the Olympics by winning the gold medal and securing an outright berth at the 2019 OFC Olympic Qualifying Tournament in Fiji.

Team roster

Group play

Quarter-final

Women's tournament

New Zealand women's football team qualified for the Olympics by winning the gold medal and securing an outright berth at the 2018 OFC Women's Nations Cup in New Caledonia.

Team roster

Group play

Golf

New Zealand announced a team of two golfers in July 2021. Danny Lee qualified but chose not to play.

Gymnastics

Artistic
New Zealand entered one male artistic gymnast into the Olympic competition by winning the gold medal and securing an outright berth at the 2021 Oceanian Championships in Queensland, Australia.

Men

Trampoline
New Zealand qualified one gymnast each to compete in the men's and women's trampoline by finishing among the top eight nations vying for qualification at the two-year-long World Cup Series. Maddie Davidson will be New Zealand's first female trampolinist at the Olympics.

Karate
 
New Zealand entered one karateka into the inaugural Olympic tournament. Alexandrea Anacan secured a place in the women's kata category, as the highest-ranked karateka vying for qualification from the Oceania zone based on the WKD Olympic Rankings.

Kata

Rowing

New Zealand qualified ten out of fourteen boats for each of the following rowing classes into the Olympic regatta, with the majority of crews confirming Olympic places for their boats at the 2019 FISA World Championships in Ottensheim, Austria. In May 2021, the men's eight crew was added to the New Zealand roster with a top-two finish at the 2021 FISA Final Qualification Regatta in Lucerne, Switzerland.

On 23 April 2021, the New Zealand Olympic Committee declined its quota place in the women's lightweight double sculls, having previously confirmed it from the 2019 Worlds.

Qualification Legend: FA=Final A (medal); FB=Final B (non-medal); FC=Final C (non-medal); FD=Final D (non-medal); FE=Final E (non-medal); FF=Final F (non-medal); SA/B=Semifinals A/B; SC/D=Semifinals C/D; SE/F=Semifinals E/F; QF=Quarterfinals; R=Repechage

Rugby sevens

Summary

Men's tournament

The New Zealand national rugby sevens team qualified for the Olympics by advancing to the quarterfinals in the 2019 London Sevens, securing a top four spot in the 2018–19 World Rugby Sevens Series.

Team roster

Group play

Quarter-final

Semi-final

Gold medal match

Women's tournament

The New Zealand women's national rugby sevens team qualified for the Olympics by securing a top four position in the 2018–19 World Rugby Women's Sevens Series through winning the penultimate leg.

Team roster
 Women's team event – 1 team of 12 players

Group play

Quarter-final

Semi-final

Gold medal match

Sailing

New Zealand sailors qualified one boat in each of the following classes through the 2018 Sailing World Championships, the class-associated Worlds, and the continental regattas. On 4 March 2020, New Zealand Olympic Committee officially announced the first seven sailors to compete at the Enoshima regatta, including defending 49er champions Peter Burling and Blair Tuke, Rio 2016 49erFX silver medallists Alex Maloney and Molly Meech, and Rio 2016 Laser bronze medallist Sam Meech. The men's 470 crew members Paul Snow-Hansen and Daniel Willcox were named to the New Zealand team on 30 September 2020, with Rio 2016 Olympian Josh Junior completing the sailing selection at the 2021 Finn Gold Cup in Lisbon, Portugal.

At the end of the qualifying window, the New Zealand Olympic Committee officially declined the quota places already obtained at the respective Sailing World Championships in the following classes: men's and women's RS:X, women's Laser Radial, and women's 470.

Men

Women

Mixed

M* = Medal race (double points); EL = Eliminated – did not advance into the medal race

Shooting 

New Zealand shooters achieved quota places for the following events by virtue of their best finishes at the 2018 ISSF World Championships, the 2019 ISSF World Cup series, and Oceania Championships, as long as they obtained a minimum qualifying score (MQS) by 31 May 2020.

Rio 2016 Olympians Chloe Tipple (women's skeet) and silver medalist Natalie Rooney were officially selected to the New Zealand team before the Games postponed on 24 March 2020.

Surfing

New Zealand sent two surfers (one man and one woman) to compete in their respective shortboard races at the Games. Billy Stairmand and Ella Williams secured a qualification slot each for their nation, as the highest-ranked and last remaining surfers from Oceania, at the 2019 ISA World Surfing Games in Miyazaki, Japan.

Swimming 

New Zealand swimmers further achieved qualifying standards in the following events (up to a maximum of 2 swimmers in each event at the Olympic Qualifying Time (OQT), and potentially 1 at the Olympic Selection Time (OST)): To assure their selection to the Olympic team, swimmers must attain an Olympic qualifying cut in each individual pool event at any FINA-sanctioned meet between March 2019 and 21 May 2021. The team was announced on 16 June 2021.

Taekwondo

New Zealand entered one athlete into the taekwondo competition at the Games. Tom Burns secured a spot in the men's lightweight category (68 kg) with a gold-medal triumph at the 2020 Oceania Qualification Tournament in Gold Coast, Queensland, Australia.

Tennis

On 23 June 2021, Tennis New Zealand announced that Marcus Daniell and Michael Venus would represent New Zealand in men's doubles for the second consecutive Olympic Games.

Triathlon

New Zealand qualified four triathletes (two per gender) for the following events at the Games by finishing among the top seven nations in the ITU Mixed Relay Olympic Rankings.

Individual

Relay

Weightlifting

New Zealand entered five weightlifters (two men and three women) into the Olympic competition. Laurel Hubbard, who made history as the first openly transgender weightlifter to compete at the Games, finished seventh of the eight entrants in the women's +87 kg category based on the IWF Absolute World Rankings, with Cameron McTaggart (men's 81 kg), David Liti (men's +109 kg), Megan Signal (women's 76 kg), and Kanah Andrews-Nahu (women's 87 kg) topping the field of weightlifters vying for qualification from Oceania based on the IWF Absolute Continental Rankings. Megan Signal withdrew due to injury shortly before her competition began.

Sports that declined qualification allocations

Archery

New Zealand had last competed in archery at the 2004 Athens Olympics. The country qualified one male and one female archer at the 2019 Pacific Games in Apia, Samoa, through Olivia Hodgson and Adam Kaluzny beating their Australian competitors. To gain nomination at the Olympics, athletes need to be put forward by Archery New Zealand (ANZ) to the New Zealand Olympic Committee, but the organisation argued that no New Zealand archers had met their criteria. Two female archers, Hodgson and Olivia Sloan, separately appealed to the Sports Tribunal to have ANZ's decision overturned. The tribunal, made up by chair Bruce Robertson, Robbie Hart and Pippa Hayward, upheld ANZ's decision in June 2021.

Artistic swimming

New Zealand qualified for a squad of two artistic swimmers to compete in the women's duet event, by securing an outright berth as the next highest-ranked pair, not yet qualified, for Oceania at the 2019 FINA World Championships in Gwangju, South Korea, marking the country's recurrence to the sport for the first time since Beijing 2008. Artistic Swimming NZ subsequently declined to take up the spot, and its place will be reassigned to another country by FINA (the International Swimming Federation).

Badminton

Oceania qualified for one player in the Olympics and the seat was allocated to New Zealand. Indian-born Abhinav Manota was New Zealand's choice for the men's singles as the country's top-ranked badminton player. When the New Zealand Olympic Committee declined the position, the Oceania qualification could not be reassigned within the region, but the seat was instead allocated to the highest-ranked player who had not qualified yet: the Hungarian Gergely Krausz.

Modern pentathlon

New Zealand qualified one modern pentathlete for the women's event, signifying the country's return to the sport after four decades. Rebecca Jamieson secured her selection as Oceania's top-ranked modern pentathlete at the 2019 Asia & Oceania Championships in Kunming, China. Marina Carrier of Australia came in second and thus did not qualify.

In February 2020, New Zealand declined its quota spot. This retrospectively qualified Carrier for the Olympics instead.

See also
New Zealand at the 2020 Summer Paralympics

References

Nations at the 2020 Summer Olympics
2020
2021 in New Zealand sport